Pterostylis scabra, commonly known as the green-veined shell orchid, is a species of orchid endemic to the south-west of Western Australia. As with similar orchids, the flowering plants differ from those which are not flowering. The non-flowering plants have a rosette of leaves but the flowering plants lack a rosette and have a single flower with leaves on the flowering spike. This greenhood has a white flower with green and pale brownish-fawn stripes and a long, curved protruding labellum. It is found in inland areas between Kalbarri and Esperance.

Description
The flowers are white with green and pale brownish-fawn stripes. The dorsal sepal and petals are fused, forming a hood or "galea" over the column, the dorsal sepal curving forward with a short pointed tip. The labellum is long, narrow and down-curved, protruding prominently above the sinus between the lateral sepals. Flowering occurs from May to August.

Taxonomy and naming
Pterostylis scabra was first formally described in 1840 by John Lindley and the description was published in the A Sketch of the Vegetation of the Swan River Colony. The specific epithet (scabra) is a Latin word meaning "rough", "scurfy" or "scabby", referring to the rough surface of the labellum.

Distribution and habitat
The green-veined shell orchid is found in inland areas between Kalbarri and Esperance in the Avon Wheatbelt, Esperance Plains, Geraldton Sandplains, Jarrah Forest and Mallee biogeographic regions.

Conservation
Pterostylis scabra is classified as "not threatened" by the Western Australian Government Department of Parks and Wildlife. It usually grows in moist, shaded areas, often near temporary streams but also grows in woodland and on granite outcrops.

References

scabra
Endemic orchids of Australia
Orchids of Western Australia
Plants described in 1840